Manfred Weiss may refer to:

 Manfréd Weiss Steel and Metal Works, a machine factory in Hungary
 Manfred Weiss (composer) (born 1935), German composer
 Manfred Weiß, (1944–2017), a German politician